Hettlingen is a municipality in the district of Winterthur in the canton of Zürich in Switzerland.

History

Hettlingen is first mentioned in 886 as Hetelinga.

Geography
Of this area, 61.3% is used for agricultural purposes, while 21.8% is forested. Of the rest of the land, 16.1% is settled (buildings or roads) and the remainder (0.9%) is non-productive (rivers, glaciers or mountains).   housing and buildings made up 10.7% of the total area, while transportation infrastructure made up the rest (5.8%). Of the total unproductive area, water (streams and lakes) made up 0.2% of the area.   13.8% of the total municipal area was undergoing some type of construction.

The municipality is located in the southern Zürcher Weinland.

Demographics
, 6.6% of the population was made up of foreign nationals.   the gender distribution of the population was 48.6% male and 51.4% female. Over the last 10 years the population has grown at a rate of 41.9%. Most of the population speaks German  (94.7%), with French being second most common ( 1.0%) and English being third ( 0.9%).

In the 2007 election the most popular party was the SVP which received 39.1% of the vote.  The next three most popular parties were the FDP (17.2%), the CSP (13.3%) and the SPS (13.2%).

The age distribution of the population is children and teenagers (0–19 years old) make up 26.4% of the population, while adults (20–64 years old) make up 61.2% and seniors (over 64 years old) make up 12.3%.  The entire Swiss population is generally well educated.  In Hettlingen about 86.2% of the population (between age 25–64) have completed either non-mandatory upper secondary education or additional higher education (either university or a Fachhochschule).  There are 922 households in Hettlingen.

Hettlingen has an unemployment rate of 1.07%.  , there were 70 people employed in the primary economic sector and about 26 businesses involved in this sector.  66 people are employed in the secondary sector and there are 20 businesses in this sector.  414 people are employed in the tertiary sector, with 56 businesses in this sector.   35.2% of the working population were employed full-time, and 64.8% were employed part-time.

 there were 618 Catholics and 1679 Protestants in Hettlingen. In the 2000 census, religion was broken down into several smaller categories. Of the rest of the population, 0% were Muslim, 2.9% belonged to another religion (not listed), 2.6% did not give a religion, and 11.1% were atheist or agnostic.

The historical population is given in the following table:

Transportation 

Hettlingen railway station is a stop of the S-Bahn Zürich on the line S33.

References

External links 

  
 

Municipalities of the canton of Zürich